Big Brother All-Stars is a Bulgarian reality television show. The show is a spin-off of the original series of Bulgarian Big Brother. It featured former housemates from previous series of Big Brother, VIP Brother and other reality show such as Survivor, X Factor, VIP Dance, Music Idol, The Mole, Temptation Island, MasterChef and The Farm.

From its inception in 2012, Big Brother All-Stars has been broadcast on Nova Television. The show is presented by Niki Kanchev. Aleksandra Sarchadjieva was a co-host.

For the fifth and sixth seasons, the show used the name Big Brother: Most Wanted.

Season details

External links
 Official site

Bulgarian television series
Big Brother (Bulgarian TV series)
Nova (Bulgarian TV channel) original programming